Northern Ireland, like the rest of the British Isles, is dotted with hillforts. The Atlas of Hillforts of Britain and Ireland lists thirty-two such forts. These are classically defined as small hilltop settlements fortified with earthworks, but many are not located on hills, and probably did not function as forts. Their function is unclear; although conventionally interpreted as defensive fortifications and centres of economic political power, there is little evidence that they were ever attacked, and more recent scholarship has suggested that they may be better interpreted as monuments.

County Antrim 
Ballygill North (Rathlin Island), promontory fort
Carncoagh, contour fort
Carnduff, promontory fort
Carravindoon (Rathlin Island), promontory fort
Carrickagile (Rathlin Island), promontory fort
Derrynaseer, contour fort
Dooninish, promontory fort
Dunineny Castle, promontory fort
Dunmull, partial contour fort
Galboly Lower, promontory fort
Knockdhu, promontory fort
Larrybane, promontory fort
Lurigethan, promontory fort
Lyles Hill, partial contour fort
McArt's Fort, promontory fort

County Armagh 
Forkill, contour fort
Haughey's Fort, multiple enclosure hillfort
Lisbanoe, multiple enclosure hillfort

County Down 
Coolnacran in Whyte's Estate, Loughbrickland.
Downpatrick, contour fort
Dromorebrague, contour fort
Lisnagade, earthen ringfort
Magheraknock, contour fort

County Fermanagh 
Doagh Glebe, promontory fort

County Londonderry 
Dungannon Fort, promontory fort
Tintagh, promontory fort

County Tyrone 
Aghnahoo, multiple enclosure hillfort
Cabragh Fort, contour fort
Clogher, contour fort
Clogher Demesne, contour fort
Freughmore, contour fort
Lisbancarney, multiple enclosure hillfort
Mallabeny, contour fort
Tycanny, partial contour fort

References 

Geography of Northern Ireland
Northern ireland